Rob Powell is an American athlete and fitness coach. He has two certified World Fitness Challenge (WFC)/Guinness World Records (2001 and 2002) and is a 4 time World Fitness/Conditioning Champion (2001, 2002, 2003 and 2004).  Powell founded The WFC Workout, The World's Fittest Workout Apps.  He retired from competition in 2011.

Early life
Powell grew up on a ranch in Dry Creek, Texas.  He graduated from W.H. Ford High School as well as South Plains College and Texas Tech University.

Guinness World Records
There are specific rules and events for Guinness World Records set by Rob Powell.
Powell's Guinness World Records are unmatched and consist of the following;

 2 Mile Swim
 12 Mile Run
 12 Mile Hike
 1,250 Push Ups
 1,250 Leg Lifts
 1,250 Jumping Jacks
 110 Mile Cycling
 20 Mile Row
 20 Mile Elliptical
 3,250 Sit Ups
 Lift 300,000 Pounds of Weight (upper body only)

Times
 October 27–28, 2001, 22:11:40 bettering Joe Decker's World Record.
 October 26–27, 2002, 19:17:38 bettering his own world record by nearly 3 hours.
 WFC 1, October 25–26, 2003, 18:36:15
 WFC 2, October 30–31, 2004, 17:45:03

WFC
The World fitness challenge consist of the following activities.
 1 Mile Swim
 5 Mile Run
 5 Mile Hike
 250 Pop-Ups
 250 Hang Knee Lifts
 50 Mile Cycle
 10 Mile Row
 10 Mile Elliptical
 1,500 Crunches
 150,000 Pounds Lifted

The World Fitness Championship for (Men Only) is:
 2 Mile Swim
 10 Mile Run
 10 Mile Hike
 500 Pop-Ups
 500 Hang Knee Lifts
 100 Mile Cycle
 20 Mile Row
 20 Mile Elliptical
 3,000 Crunches
 300,000 Pounds Lifted

References

External links
 World Fitness Champion official site

American exercise instructors
American male middle-distance runners
Texas Tech University alumni
Sportspeople from Texas
Year of birth missing (living people)
Living people